Bright Blue is an independent think tank and pressure group advocating for liberal conservative ideas and policies, based in the United Kingdom. Founded in 2014 by British entrepreneur Ryan Shorthouse, Bright Blue aims to "defend and champion liberal, open, democratic and meritocratic values, institutions and policies." Bright Blue is a membership-based think tank, with membership open to anyone who identifies as a liberal conservative.

The Daily Telegraph has described the organisation as "the modernising wing of the Tory party" and the ConservativeHome website has described it as "a deep intellectual gene pool for the Conservative Party's future". In 2018, the Evening Standard noted that Bright Blue "has managed to set the party’s agenda on a number of issues". In 2016, 2017, 2018, and 2019, it was shortlisted for both UK Social Policy Think Tank of The Year and UK Environment & Energy Think Tank of The Year in the annual Prospect awards.

Research

Bright Blue covers five main research themes in its work, including energy and environment policy; human rights and discrimination; integrated Britain; social reform; and ageing society.

Its first publication was the book Tory Modernisation 2.0 published in 2013. Tory Modernisation 2.0 is described as recommending "policies and a vision that the Conservative Party should adopt to improve society and the economy, to win in 2015, and beyond". The book contains contributions from various conservative intellectuals and members of parliament, including Matthew d'Ancona, Francis Maude and David Willetts.

In April 2014, Bright Blue published its second book, The Modernisers’ Manifesto. The book outlined how the Conservative Party can demonstrate credibility and fresh ideas to convince the electorate that they need a second term in government to make Britain "a fairer nation with a stronger economy and high-quality public services". The book contained contributions from a range of high-profile opinion formers and policy makers such as Liam Fox, Andrew Mitchell, Zac Goldsmith, Laura Sandys, Nick Hurd, George Freeman, Isabel Hardman, Matthew Parris and Ian Birrell.

Influence 
Bright Blue has seen a number of policies adopted by the UK Government. In 2019, the think-tank successfully campaigned for the introduction of a low-carbon obligation on gas suppliers. The government has also recently embraced other Bright Blue policy suggestions including making the breach of a Domestic Abuse Protection Order (DAPO) a criminal offence; extending Tier 5 Youth Mobility visas to more countries; increasing the period of time international students can stay in the UK on a Tier 4 visa after their course has completed; the ONS asking a voluntary question about gender identity in the Census from 2021; the appointment reforming rural payments after Britain leaves the EU Common Agricultural Policy, the cutting of Stamp Duty for nearly all first-time buyers, announcing a new flexible lifelong loan entitlement to four years of post-18 education, ending the support for fossil fuel sector overseas, the banning of bottom trawling in marine protected areas, including international aviation and shipping in new carbon budgets, extending the Youth Mobility Visa scheme to India, ensuring all new UK bilateral aid is spent in a way that does no harm to nature, accelerating the phase-out of coal, discretionary suspensions of the Minimum Income Floor for Universal Credit claimants, ensuring the central government vehicle fleet will be zero emission as soon as possible, making the right to request flexible working a right from day one, extending student loan repayment period to 40 years, maintaining the telemedicine abortion service, removing the ability of local authorities to charge for the disposal of DIY waste from households at waste disposal sites, appointing Ofgem as the new regulator for heat networks, and increasing in the salary threshold for the repayment of student loan.

Reports 
Bright Blue regularly publishes original research reports and academic articles.

Publications

2022 
A carbonless crucible? Forging a UK steel industry
A vision for tax reform in the 2020s
Stepping up: public attitudes to addressing the cost of living crisis
Greening UK Export Finance
Energising enterprise: reforming business taxes
Fast track? European climate diplomacy after COP26
Sustained pressure?
Rightfully rewarded? Reforming taxes on work and wealth
Blown off course? Public perceptions and expectations of the current Government
In deep water? Mapping the impacts of flooding in the UK since 2007

2021 
No place like home: The benefits and challenges of home working during the pandemic
Beyond the safety net? Informal sources of support for Universal Credit claimants during the COVID-19 pandemic
Under stress? The experiences of benefit claimants during the pandemic
Green money: a plan to reform UK carbon pricing
Nature positive? Public attitudes towards the natural environment
Benefit to all? Financial experience of Universal Credit claimants during the pandemic
Home truths: options for reforming residential property taxes in England
Increasingly precarious? Young adults during the pandemic
Shaky foundations
Toward Green Export Finance? Investigating the views of UK exporting firms towards UKEF
Driving uptake: maturing the market for battery electric vehicles
Widening chasms

2020 
A better reward? Public attitudes to citizenship
Going greener? Public attitudes to net zero
Delivering net zero: Building Britain's resilient recovery
Separate support? Attitudes to social security in Scotland
Global green giant? A policy story
Framing the future: a new pensions commission

2019 
Distant neighbours? Understanding and measuring social integration in England
Helping hand? Improving Universal Credit
 Pressure in the pipeline: Decarbonising the UK's Gas
Emission impossible? Air pollution, national governance, and the transport sector
Distant neighbours?

2018 
 Clearing the air: Reducing air pollution in the West Midlands
 Conservation Nation
 Saving global nature: greening UK Official Development Assistance
 Hotting up: Strengthening the Climate Change Act ten years on
 Burning Injustices

2017 
 Saving for the future: extending the consensus on workplace pensions
 Individual identity: Understanding how conservatives think about human rights and discrimination
 A greener, more pleasant land: a new market-based commissioning scheme for rural payments
 Fighting for freedom? The historic and future relationship between conservatism and human rights
 Britain breaking barriers
 Green conservatives? Understanding what conservatives think about the environment

Projects 
It also manages a weekly updated blog, Centre Write, which started in May 2014. The blog promotes articles submitted by its community of liberal conservative thinkers.

Magazine 
Bright Blue publishes the quarterly magazine Centre Write. Each edition seeks to explore different themes and issues that the United Kingdom is currently facing. It features contributions from leading academics, politicians, commentators, and thinkers.

Organisation 
The board of directors is made up of Sarah Sands (chair), Ryan Shorthouse (Director), Alexandra Jezeph, Diane Banks, Phil Clarke and Richard Mabey. It currently has nine Associate Fellows: Helen Jackson, Kieron O'Hara, Nick Tyrone, Ben Gadsby, Andrew O'Brien, Michael Stephens, Kieran Cooke and Michael Johnson. It has a list of nearly 200 Parliamentary supporters, and an independent Advisory Council from different political and professional backgrounds - including multiple Conservative parliamentarians such as such as Michael Gove, Matt Hancock, Nicky Morgan, Damian Green, and Penny Mordaunt.

In November 2022, Ryan Shorthouse announced that he would stand down as Director of Bright Blue and step up to Chair the organisation, criticizing the Conservative government for having "failed millennials" and citing disagreements over housebuilding policies and soaring childcare costs. Bright Blue is appointing a new CEO in 2023.

Funding 
Bright Blue is a not-for-profit company that is funded by a range of organisations. It acknowledges its sponsoring partners in all reports and advertising materials. The Joseph Rowntree Reform Trust, Joseph Rowntree Foundation, Open Society Foundations, Lloyds Bank Foundation, and Oak Foundation are some such organisations. In November 2022, the funding transparency website Who Funds You? gave Bright Blue a C grade (rating goes from A to E).

See also 

 List of Think Tanks in the United Kingdom

References

External links

Political and economic think tanks based in the United Kingdom
Organisations associated with the Conservative Party (UK)
Organisations based in London
Advocacy groups in the United Kingdom
Liberal conservatism
Think tanks based in the United Kingdom
Think tanks established in 2014